Carabus splendens is a species of beetle endemic to Europe, where it is observed in mainland France and mainland Spain.

References

splendens
Beetles described in 1790
Beetles of Europe